Eggebrecht may refer to:

 Julian Eggebrecht, video game developer 
 Renate Eggebrecht (b. 1944), German violinist and record producer
 Axel Eggebrecht (1899–1991), German journalist and writer 
 Hans Heinrich Eggebrecht (1919−1999), German musicologist
 Echo Eggebrecht (b. 1977), New York painter